The 1869 Oamaru by-election was a by-election on 25 May 1869 in the  electorate during the 4th New Zealand Parliament.

The by-election was caused by the resignation of the incumbent MP Robert Campbell.

He was replaced by Charles Christie Graham. As there were no other nominations, he was duly declared elected. He acknowledged that he was not a local man.

References

Oamaru 1869
1869 elections in New Zealand
Politics of Otago
May 1869 events